Kvrkulja Lake ( / ) is a lake in Bosnia and Herzegovina.

See also
List of lakes in Bosnia and Herzegovina

References

External links

Lakes of Bosnia and Herzegovina